Ian P. Goulden is a Canadian and British mathematician. He works as a professor at the University of Waterloo in the department of Combinatorics and Optimization. He obtained his PhD from the University of Waterloo in 1979 under the supervision of David M. Jackson. His PhD thesis was titled Combinatorial Decompositions in the Theory of Algebraic Enumeration. Goulden is well known for his contributions in enumerative combinatorics such as the Goulden-Jackson cluster method.

Goulden was the dean at the University of Waterloo Faculty of Mathematics from 2010 to 2015 and served as chair of the Department of Combinatorics and Optimization three times.

Awards and honors 
In 2010 Goulden was elected as a Fellow of the Royal Society of Canada. In 2009 received the University of Waterloo Faculty of Mathematics Award for Distinction in Teaching, and in 1976 he received the Alumni Gold Medal for highest academic achievement at the University of Waterloo.

Contributions 
Goulden and Jackson published the book Combinatorial Enumeration. Goulden also published the book Finite Mathematics with R.G. Dunkley, R.J. MacKay, K.S. Brown, R.F. de Peiza, D.A. DiFelice, and D.E. Matthews. He has written over 90 research articles in the fields of Combinatorics, Enumerative Combinatorics, and Algebraic Geometry.

Selected publications 
 Goulden, I. P. and Jackson, D. M. (2004).  Combinatorial Enumeration.  .

See also
 List of University of Waterloo people

References

External links

 

Year of birth missing (living people)
Living people
Canadian mathematicians
Academic staff of the University of Waterloo
University of Waterloo alumni